Barloworld Scientific Ltd. was one of the UK's largest manufacturers of scientific equipment and laboratory supplies. In 2007, the company was purchased by Nova Capital Ltd and now trades under the names SciLabware Limited (glassware, and reusable plastics), Bibby-Scientific (benchtop scientific equipment), Bibby-Sterlin Ltd. (single use disposable plasticware) and, until 2012, Carbolite (furnaces, ovens and incubators). Carbolite was purchased by Verder Scientific who also purchased Gero. It is now known as Carbolite Gero.

External links
 Company website
 Bibby-Scientific website

Technology companies of the United Kingdom
Research support companies
Laboratory equipment manufacturers